Stone-Ten Stitches is the second studio album by Clay People, released in November 1997 by Re-Constriction Records.

Reception
Aiding & Abetting gave the album a positive review, saying "Clay People has infused the metal guts with something very alive." Sonic Boom credited the album's mix with revealing the talent of the performers and focusing on Daniel Neet's vocals. Black Monday gave the album a mixed review and criticized the music's inability to hold the listeners interest.

Track listing

Personnel
Adapted from the Stone-Ten Stitches liner notes.

Clay People
 Brian McGarvey – electric guitar, bass guitar, programming
 Daniel Neet – lead vocals, programming

Production and design
 George Hagegeorge – production, additional programming
 Melissa Sharlot – backing vocals (5)
 D. Patrick Walsh – cover art, art direction, design

Release history

References

External links 
 Stone - Ten Stitches at Discogs (list of releases)

1997 albums
The Clay People albums
Re-Constriction Records albums